The 2007 Thailand Open Grand Prix Gold (officially known as the SCG Thailand Open 2007 for sponsorship reasons) was a badminton tournament which took place in Bangkok, Thailand from 3 to 8 July 2007. It had a total purse of $120,000.

Tournament 
The 2007 Thailand Open Grand Prix Gold was the third tournament of the 2007 BWF Grand Prix Gold and Grand Prix and also part of the Thailand Open championships which has been held since 1984. This tournament was organized by the Badminton Association of Thailand and sanctioned by the BWF.

Venue 
This international tournament was held at Nimibutr Stadium in Bangkok, Thailand.

Point distribution 
Below is the point distribution for each phase of the tournament based on the BWF points system for the BWF Grand Prix Gold event.

Prize money 
The total prize money for this tournament was US$120,000. Distribution of prize money was in accordance with BWF regulations.

Men's singles

Seeds 

 Chen Jin (semi-finals)
 Chen Hong (champion)
 Chen Yu (withdrew)
 Boonsak Ponsana (final)
 Sony Dwi Kuncoro (withdrew)
 Andrew Smith (first round)
 Lee Tsuen Seng (quarter-finals)
 Sairul Amar Ayob (first round)
 Roslin Hashim (second round)
 Ng Wei (semi-finals)
 Chan Yan Kit (first round)
 Richard Vaughan (withdrew)
 Simon Santoso (third round)
 Joachim Persson (second round)
 Wong Choong Hann (third round)
 Eric Pang (second round)

Finals

Top half

Section 1

Section 2

Bottom half

Section 3

Section 4

Women's singles

Seeds 

 Zhu Lin (champion)
 Xu Huaiwen (quarter-finals)
 Pi Hongyan (semi-finals)
 Yao Jie (first round)
 Lu Lan (second round)
 Petya Nedelcheva (first round)
 Wong Mew Choo (withdrew)
 Yip Pui Yin (second round)

Finals

Top half

Section 1

Section 2

Bottom half

Section 3

Section 4

Men's doubles

Seeds 

 Koo Kien Keat / Tan Boon Heong (withdrew)
 Choong Tan Fook / Lee Wan Wah (quarter-finals)
 Jung Jae-sung / Lee Yong-dae (final)
 Lee Jae-jin / Hwang Ji-man (champions)
 Mohd Zakry Abdul Latif / Mohd Fairuzizuan Mohd Tazari (second round)
 Albertus Susanto Njoto / Yohan Hadikusumo Wiratama (quarter-finals)
 Tan Bin Shen / Ong Soon Hock (first round)
 Simon Mollyhus / Anders Kristiansen (second round)

Finals

Top half

Section 1

Section 2

Bottom half

Section 3

Section 4

Women's doubles

Seeds 

 Gao Ling / Huang Sui (champions)
 Lee Kyung-won / Lee Hyo-jung (semi-finals)
 Chien Yu-chin / Cheng Wen-hsing (semi-finals)
 Du Jing / Yu Yang (final)
 Wong Pei Tty / Chin Eei Hui (quarter-finals)
 Nicole Grether / Juliane Schenk (quarter-finals)
 Lena Frier Kristiansen / Kamilla Rytter Juhl (second round)
 Duanganong Aroonkesorn / Kunchala Voravichitchaikul (quarter-finals)

Finals

Top half

Section 1

Section 2

Bottom half

Section 3

Section 4

Mixed doubles

Seeds 

 Sudket Prapakamol / Saralee Thungthongkam (semi-finals)
 Thomas Laybourn / Kamilla Rytter Juhl (semi-finals)
 He Hanbin / Yu Yang (champions)
 Ingo Kindervater / Kathrin Piotrowski (quarter-finals)
 Han Sang-hoon / Hwang Yu-mi (final)
 Devin Lahardi Fitriawan / Lita Nurlita (quarter-finals)
 David Lindley / Suzanne Rayappan (quarter-finals)
 Kristof Hopp / Birgit Overzier (quarter-finals)

Finals

Top half

Section 1

Section 2

Bottom half

Section 3

Section 4

References

External links 
Tournament Link

Thailand Open
Thailand Open Grand Prix Gold
Badminton, Grand Prix Gold, Thailand Open
Badminton, Grand Prix Gold, Thailand Open
Thailand Open (badminton)
Badminton, Grand Prix Gold, Thailand Open